The Unsaved (literally "At the lower limit of the sky") is a 2013 Moldovan drama film directed by Igor Cobileanski. It was selected as the Moldovan entry for the Best Foreign Language Film at the 87th Academy Awards, but was not nominated.

Cast
 Igor Babiac as Viorel
 Ela Ionescu as Maria
 Sergiu Voloc as Gasca

See also
 List of submissions to the 87th Academy Awards for Best Foreign Language Film
 List of Moldovan submissions for the Academy Award for Best Foreign Language Film

References

External links
 

2013 films
2013 drama films
Moldovan drama films
Romanian drama films
2010s Romanian-language films